Helianthella uniflora, the oneflower helianthella, is a North American plant species in the family Asteraceae. It grows in the western United States and western Canada. It has been found from British Columbia south as far as northern Arizona and northern New Mexico.

The plant usually produces only one yellow flower head per stem, though sometimes 2 or 3, the heads not nodding (hanging). Each head contains 11-21 bright yellow ray flowers surrounding numerous yellow disc flowers.

References

External links

uniflora
Flora of the Western United States
Flora of British Columbia
Plants described in 1834
Flora without expected TNC conservation status